Harri Wessman (Helsinki, 29 March 1949) is a Finnish composer. He is best known outside Finland for his Concerto for Trumpet and Orchestra, and the choral work "Vesi väsyy lumen alle" (Water weary under snow), composed for the Tapiola Choir

References

1949 births
Living people